Albalá is a municipality located in the province of Cáceres, Extremadura, Spain, officially Albalá del Caudillo from 1960 until 2001. According to the 2006 census (INE), the municipality has a population of 850 inhabitants.

References

Municipalities in the Province of Cáceres